Gotfryd Gremlowski (5 November 1931 – 10 November 1987) was a Polish freestyle swimmer. He competed in three events at the 1952 Summer Olympics.

References

External links
 

1931 births
1987 deaths
Polish male freestyle swimmers
Olympic swimmers of Poland
Swimmers at the 1952 Summer Olympics
People from Świętochłowice
20th-century Polish people